Moreton cum Alcumlow is a civil parish in Cheshire East, England, United Kingdom. It contains 13 buildings that are recorded in the National Heritage List for England as designated listed buildings. Of these, one is listed at Grade II*, the middle grade, and the others are at Grade II. The major building in the parish is Great Moreton Hall; this and a number of structures associated with it are listed. The Macclesfield Canal runs through the parish, and four bridges crossing it are listed. Apart from the estate of Great Moreton Hall, the parish is rural, and two farmhouses are also listed.

Key

Buildings

See also
 Listed buildings in Biddulph, Staffordshire
 Listed buildings in Kidsgrove, Staffordshire
 Listed buildings in Newbold Astbury
 Listed buildings in Odd Rode
 Listed buildings in Smallwood

References

Citations

Sources

 

Listed buildings in the Borough of Cheshire East
Lists of listed buildings in Cheshire